Pseudocercospora is a genus of ascomycete fungi. An anamorphic version of the genus Mycosphaerella, Pseudocercospora species are plant pathogens, including the causal agent of the so-called South American leaf blight of the rubber tree. The widely distributed genus has been estimated to contain over 1100 species, concentrated predominantly in tropical regions. Pseudocercospora was circumscribed by Italian-Argentinian botanist Carlos Luigi Spegazzini in 1910.

References

External links 
 

 
Fungal plant pathogens and diseases
Mycosphaerellaceae genera
Taxa named by Carlo Luigi Spegazzini
Taxa described in 1910